Qatar T-10 Cricket League or QT10 League is a T-10 franchise cricket league, a form of cricket similar to Twenty20 cricket but played over only 10 overs per side. It was founded in Doha and has six teams. The tournament is organised by the Qatar Cricket Association in assistance with International Pro Event. Television broadcasts on Geo Super and online broadcast on Crictraker. The league has been approved by the International Cricket Council (ICC).

Pakistani cricketer Shahid Afridi signed as the Qatar T10 League's Ambassador.

Teams

2019 Edition 
Qatar T-10 Cricket League was the inaugural edition of the Qatar T10 League, the 10-over format tournament organized by the Qatar Cricket Association in assistance with International Pro Event from 7 December 2019 to 16 December 2019. The tournament was approved by the International Cricket Council (ICC).

The T10 league had 6 teams comprising 24 international cricket stars, 12 players from associate ICC countries, Qatar national cricket team players and other local players. South African batsman Hashim Amla was rolled in to lead the international stars. Pakistani player Mohammad Hafeez and Andre Fletcher were also amongst the other international stars to be taking part in the League.

All the matches were played at the Asian Town International Cricket Stadium, Doha.

The following teams and squads were announced for the tournament.

The final points table was,

The complete schedule of Qatar T10 League 2019 was as follows.

 All timings are mentioned as per Qatar's local time.

Investigations 
In December 2019, International Cricket Council (ICC) opened an anti corruption investigations after fixers intercepted at 2019 Qatar T10 League.

Broadcast

See also 

 Sport in Qatar
 Qatar Cricket Association
 Qatar national cricket team
 Qatar women's national cricket team

References

Ten10 cricket leagues
Cricket in Qatar
Sport in Qatar
Short form cricket